"Cherry Pie" is a song written by Joe Josea and originally performed by Marvin & Johnny in 1954 as the B-side to their single "Tick Tock".

Other versions
Six years after its first recording, a version was released by the duo Skip & Flip.  This version reached number 11 on the Billboard pop chart and number 27 on the US R&B chart in 1960.  Skip & Flip's version was ranked number 79 on Billboard magazine's Top Hot 100 songs of 1960.
Jess Conrad released a version of the song as a single in 1960 which reached number 39 on the UK Singles Chart.
Dave Bartholomew and His Orchestra released a version of the song as the B-side to their 1964 single "The Monkey Speaks His Mind".
Daddy Cool released a version of the song on their 1971 album, Daddy Who? Daddy Cool.
The Hagers released a version of the song as a single in 1974.

In popular culture
Marvin and Johnny's version of the song was mentioned in The Penguins' 1963 metasong, "Memories of El Monte".

References

1954 songs
1960 singles
1974 singles
Skip & Flip songs
Daddy Cool (band) songs
Elektra Records singles